The Tennessee Board of Regents (TBR or The College System of Tennessee) is a system of public universities in the U.S. state of Tennessee. It is one of two public university systems in the state, the other being the University of Tennessee system. It was authorized by an act of the Tennessee General Assembly passed in 1972. The TBR supervises all public community colleges and technical colleges in the state, dealing with over 140,000 students annually.

It was founded as the State University and Community College System of Tennessee. The TBR comprises 40 institutions: 13 community colleges and 27 Tennessee Colleges of Applied Technology, which are listed below. The Colleges of Applied Technology were added to TBR control in 1982. Unlike the situation in most states, TBR component institutions did not have their own board of directors, board of trustees, or similar bodies; the TBR hired institution presidents and directors and approves the promotions of senior faculty and staff. In 2015, Tennessee governor Bill Haslam announced a plan for the six universities of the TBR system to gain their own governing boards, while noting that "TBR would continue to provide key administrative support to the six state universities."

The professional head of the TBR system is its chancellor. The chancellor is responsible for guiding the TBR system in accordance with the board's direction and for managing the TBR central office in a manner consistent with the central office's mission and vision. Operational responsibilities and processes include day-to-day management of the system and the central office; board coordination, communication, and logistics; presidential searches; and dealing with the media and the general public, including handling complaints and general information requests.

The leaders of TBR colleges are presidents.

The Board of Regents is supported by the Tennessee Higher Education Commission ( THEC ), which attempts to coordinate the activities and goals of higher education in Tennessee. THEC provides the funding formula for institutions.

Member institutions

Community colleges
 Chattanooga State Community College
 Cleveland State Community College
 Columbia State Community College
 Dyersburg State Community College
 Jackson State Community College
 Motlow State Community College
 Nashville State Community College
 Northeast State Community College
 Pellissippi State Community College
 Roane State Community College
 Southwest Tennessee Community College
 Volunteer State Community College
 Walters State Community College

Tennessee Colleges of Applied Technology (TCATs)

 Athens
 Chattanooga
 Covington
 Crossville
 Crump
 Dickson
 Elizabethton
 Harriman
 Hartsville
 Hohenwald
 Jacksboro
 Jackson
 Knoxville
 Livingston
 McKenzie
 McMinnville
 Memphis
 Morristown
 Murfreesboro
 Nashville
 Newbern
 Onedia
 Paris
 Pulaski
 Ripley
 Shelbyville
 Whiteville

State universities

Six universities were managed by TBR until 2017, when the state overhauled its public higher education system by creating an independent governing board for each university. The Tennessee legislature in 2016 passed the Focus on College and University Success Act, which separated the universities from the TBR, and Gov. Haslam followed with ceremonial signings of the law at the separated universities.

The six universities formerly managed by TBR are:

 Austin Peay State University
 East Tennessee State University
 University of Memphis
 Middle Tennessee State University
 Tennessee State University
 Tennessee Technological University

Governance

Chancellors
 C. C. Humphreys, 1972–1975 
 Roy S. Nicks, 1975–1985
 Thomas J. Garland, 1986–1990
 Otis L. Floyd Jr., 1990–1993
 Charles E. Smith, 1994–2000
 Charles Manning, 2000–2010
 John G. Morgan, 2010–2016
 David Gregory (interim) 2016–2017
 Flora Tydings, February 1, 2017–present

Board
The Tennessee Board of Regents system is governed by 19 board members. The board meets four times each year at regularly scheduled meetings, and the chairman may call additional meetings during the year as needed. The 19 members of the board consist of: 12 lay citizens appointed for six-year terms by the governor, with one each from the state's nine congressional districts and three grand divisions; two faculty members from among the system institutions appointed by the governor for a one-year term; one student from among the system institutions appointed by the governor for a one-year term ; and four ex officio members—the Governor of Tennessee, the Commissioner of Education, the Commissioner of Agriculture, and the Executive Director of the Tennessee Higher Education Commission, who is a non-voting member.

See also
List of colleges and universities in Tennessee
Tennessee Blue Book

References

External links

1972 establishments in Tennessee
Government of Tennessee
Governing bodies of universities and colleges in the United States